Tularia bractea is a species of sea slug, an aeolid nudibranch, a marine gastropod mollusc in the family Flabellinidae.

Distribution
This species was described from Australia. It is known only from temperate waters in the south of Australia and New Zealand.

References

Flabellinidae
Gastropods of Australia
Gastropods of New Zealand
Gastropods described in 1962